The National Institute for Public Health and the Environment ( or simply RIVM) is a Dutch research institute that is an independent agency of the Ministry of Health, Welfare and Sport.

RIVM performs tasks to promote public health and a safe living environment by conducting research and collecting knowledge worldwide. The results are used to support the Government of the Netherlands in formulating its policy. RIVM's primary tasks are:
 research
 policy support
 national coordination
 intervention programmes
 provision of reliable information to the public and to professionals working in health care about infectious diseases, the environment, nutrition and safety.

RIVM is located in Bilthoven, Utrecht and employs over 1,500 people, many of whom work in multidisciplinary fields.

History
RIVM was founded in 1910 when the Central Laboratory for Public Health was created.

The present size of the institute is the result of a merger between three government institutes in 1984.

RIVM has become a large, complex organisation with many different international links and a range of activities.

During the Covid-19 pandemic, the RIVM was tasked with oversight of the disease and how the Dutch government would combat it. They RIVM instituted weekly counts of infected people within the nation's borders. The director of the Infectious Disease Control bureau, Jaap van Dissel, was charged with disease reduction efforts.

By July 2021, the RIVM, which was a reference laboratory for the World Health Organization, recognized five types of covid test technology:
 the PCR test
 the loop-mediated isothermal amplification (LAMP) test
 the antigen test
 the serological test
 the breathalyzer test

On 13 August 2021, government announced with RIVM approval that "From 30 August social distancing will no longer be required at secondary vocational schools (MBOs), higher professional education institutions (HBOs) and universities."

Organisation

The RIVM organisation consists of three domains with specific knowledge and expertise: Infectious Diseases and Vaccinology (Centre for Infectious Disease Control), Environment and Safety (including environmental incident service), Public Health and Health Services (including food and food safety).

See also
 KNMI (institute)
 Netherlands Environmental Assessment Agency
 National public health institutes

Notes and references

Further reading

External links
 About RIVM
 RIVM website
 International Association of National Public Health Institutes (IANPHI)
 RIVM in the scientific portal NARCIS

Research institutes in the Netherlands
Government agencies of the Netherlands
Medical and health organisations based in the Netherlands
Atmospheric dispersion modeling
Netherlands
Biosafety level 4 laboratories
National public health agencies